The 1979–80 Michigan Wolverines men's basketball team represented the University of Michigan in intercollegiate college basketball during the 1979–80 NCAA Division I men's basketball season. The team played its home games in the Crisler Arena in Ann Arbor, Michigan, and was a member of the Big Ten Conference. Under the direction of head coach Johnny Orr who was in his final year as coach, the team finished tied for sixth in the Big Ten Conference. The team earned an invitation to the 1980 National Invitation Tournament. The team was unranked the entire season in the Associated Press Top Twenty Poll, and it also ended the season unranked in the final UPI Coaches' Poll. The team defeated two of the six ranked teams it faced (#2 Ohio State 75–74 at home on January 19, 1980, and #15 Purdue at home 75–64 on February 21). Marty Bodnar earned third team Academic All-American honors. Bodnar and Mark Lozier served as team captains, while Mike McGee earned team MVP honors. John Garris set the School record for career blocked shot average with 1.09, which lasted until 1986 when Roy Tarpley ended his career with a 2.06 average. No Wolverine would surpass 13 assists in a game until Gary Grant did so on December 7, 1987. Thad Garner averaged of 36.3 minutes per game, which was a school record, beating Mike McGee who averaged 36.2. He would break his own record two years later.

In the 32-team National Invitation Tournament, Michigan advanced to the elite eight round by defeating  76–69 and   75–65 before losing to Virginia Cavaliers 79–68.

Roster

Team players drafted into the NBA
Five players from this team were selected in the NBA Draft.

See also
 NIT all-time team records
 NIT bids by school and conference
 NIT championships and semifinal appearances
 1980 in Michigan

References

Michigan
Michigan Wolverines men's basketball seasons
Michigan
Michigan Wolve
Michigan Wolve